Reginaldo Rodrigues dos Santos (14 February 1944 – 20 December 2013), better known by his stage name Reginaldo Rossi, was a Brazilian musician and singer-songwriter. He was known as the "King of Brega".

Discography 
LPs
 1966 – O pão; Chantecler
 O rei leão 
 1967 – Festa dos pães; Chantecler
 1968 – O Quente (1968); Chantecler
 1970 – À procura de você; CBS
 1971 – Reginaldo Rossi; CBS
 1972 – Nos teus braços; CBS
 1973 – Reginaldo Rossi; CBS
 1974 – Reginaldo Rossi; CBS
 1976 – Reginaldo Rossi; Beverly
 1977 – Chega de promessas; CBS
 1980 – A volta; EMI
 1981 – Cheio de amor; EMI
 1982 – A raposa e as uvas'; EMI
 1983 – Sonha comigo; EMI
 1984– Não consigo te esquecer; EMI
 1985 – Só sei que te quero bem; EMI
 1986 – Com todo coração; EMI
 1987 – Teu melhor amigo; EMI
 1989 – Momentos de amor; EMI
 1990 – O rei; EMI
 1992 – Reginaldo Rossi; Celim

Albums
 1997 – Reginaldo Rossi – Tão Sofrido; Polydisc
 1998 – Reginaldo Rossi-ao vivo; Polydisc
 1999 – Reginaldo Rossi the king; Sony Music
 1999 – Popularidade-Reginaldo Rossi; Continental
 2000 – Reginaldo Rossi; Sony Music
 2001 – Reginaldo Rossi ao vivo; Sony Music
 2001 – Para Sempre -Reginaldo Rossi; EMI
 2003 – Reginaldo Rossi; EMI
 2003 – Ao Vivo, O melhor do brega; Indie Records
 2010 – Cabaret do Rossi Greatest hits 
 Se Meu Amor Não Chegar Garçom (Reginaldo Rossi)
 A raposa e as uvas (Reginaldo Rossi)
 O pão (Reginaldo Rossi, Orácio Faustino e Namyr Cury)
 Deixa de banca (Borogodá version, of Pocker, made by Eduardo Araújo and Ferrer)
 Tô doidão (Picket e F. Thomas)
 Mon amour, meu bem, ma femme (Cleide)
 Era Domingo (Reginaldo Rossi)
 Ai, Amor (Reginaldo Rossi)
 Em Plena Lua de Mel (Reginaldo Rossi)
 Tenta Esquecer'' (Reginaldo Rossi)

Cancer and death 

On 9 November Rase 2013, Rossi a very heavy smoker went through a surgical procedure called thoracentesis removing 2 liters of accumulated fluids between the pleura and the lung. The biopsy revealed on the 11th of the same month the confirmation of lung cancer. 
Reginaldo Rossi died on 20 December 2013, aged 69, in his hometown of Recife, Pernambuco.

References

External links

1944 births
2013 deaths
People from Recife
20th-century Brazilian male singers
20th-century Brazilian singers
Brazilian rock musicians
Deaths from cancer in Pernambuco
Deaths from lung cancer
Brazilian male singer-songwriters